Jamie Halcro Johnston (born 8 October 1975) is a British politician who is a Member of the Scottish Parliament (MSP) for the Highlands and Islands region since 2017. A member of the Scottish Conservative Party, he also serves as their Shadow Minister for Business, Trade, Tourism and Enterprise.

Background

Halcro Johnston was brought up at his family home in Orphir in Orkney. His father, Hugh Halcro Johnston, previously served as Convener of Orkney Islands Council. His great-great uncle is Henry Halcro Johnston, a botanist, British Army Officer and Scotland rugby union international.

Educated at Radley College, Halcro Johnston studied at Coventry University and the University of Exeter, where he received a BA (Hons) in Ancient History. He was previously employed by the Financial Times in London and, between 2003 and 2007, he worked as an adviser to a number of Scottish Conservative MSPs, before moving to a position at Holyrood magazine.

Political career

Halcro Johnston stood for election to the Scottish Parliament in Inverness East, Nairn and Lochaber in 2007 and then the Orkney constituency in 2011 and 2016. He also stood for UK Parliament in the Moray constituency in 2005 and the Orkney and Shetland seat in 2017.

In the Scottish Parliament
Following the resignation of Douglas Ross to take up a position as a Member of the UK Parliament after his election in the 2017 general election, Halcro Johnston became a Member of the Scottish Parliament on the Highlands and Islands regional list on 20 June 2017; with the party having gained 44,693 votes in the region at the 2016 election.

After entering the Scottish Parliament, he was appointed by party leader Ruth Davidson as the Scottish Conservative and Unionist Shadow Minister for Jobs, Employability and Training. He served as Shadow Cabinet Secretary for Rural Economy and Tourism, being appointed by leader Douglas Ross in 2020.

In the 2021 Scottish Parliament election, Halcro Johnston stood in the Skye, Lochaber and Badenoch constituency, finishing in second place. He was re-elected on the Highlands and Islands regional list with the Scottish Conservatives increasing their number of MSPs in the region from three to four.

Notes

References

External links 
 

1975 births
Living people
Place of birth missing (living people)
People from Orkney
People educated at Radley College
Conservative MSPs
Members of the Scottish Parliament 2016–2021
Members of the Scottish Parliament 2021–2026